Flashpoint is a live album by the English rock band the Rolling Stones, their first live album by the group since 1982's Still Life. The album was compiled by Chris Kimsey with the assistance of Chris Potter.

The album was recorded in 1989 and 1990 on the Steel Wheels/Urban Jungle Tour and released in 1991. Steel Wheels Live, released in 2020, is another release from the tour, with a complete 1989 concert and a selection of live rarities.

The tour and the two studio tracks recorded for Flashpoint were the last for bassist and long-time member Bill Wyman as a Rolling Stone.

History

Recorded across North America, Europe and Japan, Flashpoint is also the first Rolling Stones release of the 1990s and, unlike previous live sets, includes two new studio tracks: "Highwire" and "Sex Drive"; the former was released as a single earlier in 1991 and was a comment on the Gulf War. The latter was described as a "basically a dance-track" by Chris Jagger, and a remix 12" would be released of it later that year.

Although the live selections are mostly familiar hits mixed in with new tracks from Steel Wheels, Flashpoint also includes lesser-known songs like "Factory Girl" from 1968's Beggars Banquet and "Little Red Rooster", originally a No. 1 UK hit single in 1964, featured here with special guest Eric Clapton on guitar. According to Chris Jagger, some of the backing vocals were re-recorded and Ron Wood added guitar to three tracks afterwards.

Flashpoint was recorded using binaural recording. This gives the effect that the concert audience is behind the home listener.

The audience cheer track was taken from the Rolling Stones' 1970 live album Get Yer Ya-Ya's Out!, complete with an audience member shouting out a request: "'Paint It Black', 'Paint It Black', you devil".

Bill Wyman's departure

As Flashpoint was The Rolling Stones' final release under their contract with Sony Music, the band signed a new lucrative long-term worldwide deal with Virgin Records in 1991, with the exception of Bill Wyman.

After 30 years with the band, the 55-year-old Wyman decided that he had other interests he wanted to pursue and felt that, considering the size of the recently completed Steel Wheels project and tour, it was fitting to bow out at that time.

Although he would not officially announce his departure until January 1993 – during the interim the rest of the band had repeatedly asked him to reconsider – he had talked about leaving the band for at least ten years.

After Wyman's departure, Ronnie Wood was taken off salary and made a full member of the Rolling Stones partnership, eighteen years after he joined the band.

Release

Flashpoint was released in April 1991 and was generally well-received, with "Highwire" becoming a rock radio hit, and managed to reach No. 6 in the UK and No. 16 in the US, where it went gold.

In 1998, Flashpoint was remastered and reissued by Virgin Records, and again in 2010 by Universal Music.

Track listing
All tracks written by Mick Jagger and Keith Richards, except where noted.

CD
"(Intro) Continental Drift" – 0:26
"Start Me Up" – 3:54 
"Sad Sad Sad" – 3:33 
"Miss You" – 5:55 
"Rock and a Hard Place" – 4:52 
"Ruby Tuesday" – 3:33 
"You Can't Always Get What You Want" – 7:26 
"Factory Girl" – 2:47 
"Can't Be Seen" – 4:17 
"Little Red Rooster" (Willie Dixon) – 5:15 
"Paint It Black" – 4:02 
"Sympathy for the Devil" – 5:35 
"Brown Sugar" – 4:06 
"Jumpin' Jack Flash" – 5:00 
"(I Can't Get No) Satisfaction" – 6:09 
"Highwire" – 4:44
"Sex Drive" – 5:07

"Rock and a Hard Place" and "Can't Be Seen", were not included on the vinyl version.

Cassette Tape
Side one
(Intro) "Continental Drift" – 0:29
"Start Me Up" – 3:54
"Sad Sad Sad" – 3:33
"Miss You" – 5:55
"Rock and a Hard Place" – 4:52
"Ruby Tuesday" – 3:34
"You Can't Always Get What You Want" – 7:26
"Factory Girl" – 2:48
"Sex Drive" – 4:28

Side two
"Can't Be Seen" – 4:17
"Little Red Rooster" (Dixon) – 5:15
"Paint It Black" – 4:02
"Sympathy for the Devil" – 5:35
"Brown Sugar" – 4:10
"Jumpin' Jack Flash" – 5:00
"(I Can't Get No) Satisfaction" – 6:08
"Highwire" – 4:46

Other songs/B-sides and charity single
The following songs were recorded during the same set of concerts and later released as B-sides:
"2000 Light Years from Home" – 3:24  (13 June 1990; Olympic Stadium; Barcelona Spain) – Only released on "Highwire" singles
"Gimme Shelter" – 4:47  (26 November 1989; Memorial Stadium; Clemson, South Carolina) – Charity single released in 1993
"Harlem Shuffle" (Bob Relf, Ernest Nelson) – 4:35  (27 February 1990; Korakuen Dome; Tokyo, Japan) – Only released on one of the variations of the UK "Ruby Tuesday" single
"I Just Want to Make Love to You" (Dixon) – 3:58  (6 July 1990; Wembley Stadium; London, England) – Only released on "Highwire" singles
"Play with Fire" (Nanker Phelge) – 3:31  (26 November 1989; Memorial Stadium; Clemson, South Carolina) – Released on "Ruby Tuesday" single
"Street Fighting Man" – 3:43  (25 August 1990; Wembley Stadium; London, England) – Only released on "Jumpin' Jack Flash" Maxi-CD singles
"Tumbling Dice" – 4:12  (24 August 1990; Wembley Stadium; London, England) – Only released on "Jumpin' Jack Flash" singles
"Undercover of the Night" – 3:59  (19 December 1989; Atlantic City Convention Center; Atlantic City, New Jersey) – Released on the "Ruby Tuesday" single

All tracks besides "Gimme Shelter" released in 1990.

Personnel
The Rolling Stones
Mick Jagger – lead vocals, guitars, harmonica
Keith Richards – vocals, guitars
Ronnie Wood – guitars
Bill Wyman – bass guitar
Charlie Watts – drums

Additional personnel
Matt Clifford – keyboards, French horn
Chuck Leavell – keyboards, backing vocals
Bobby Keys – saxophone
Horns by The Uptown Horns – Arno Hecht, Paul Litteral, Bob Funk, Crispin Cioe
The Kick Horns - horns on "Rock and a Hard Place"
Bernard Fowler – backing vocals
Lisa Fischer – backing vocals
Cindy Mizelle – backing vocals
Lorelei McBroom- backing vocals  
Eric Clapton – guitar on "Little Red Rooster"
Live recordings by Bob Clearmountain, David Hewitt
Mastered by Bob Ludwig at Gateway Mastering Studios
Mixed by Christopher Marc Potter
Bernard Fowler – backing vocals on "Highwire"
Katie Kissoon – backing vocals on "Sex Drive"
Tessa Niles – backing vocals on "Sex Drive"
Studio tracks mixed by Chris Kimsey and Mark Stent
Engineered by Mark Stent
Assistant Engineer Nick Hartley on "Sex Drive" and "Highwire"
Art direction and design by Garry Mouat and David Crow

Charts

Weekly charts

Year-end charts

Certifications

References

1991 live albums
Albums produced by Chris Kimsey
Albums produced by the Glimmer Twins
Rolling Stones Records live albums
The Rolling Stones live albums
Virgin Records live albums